Mikhail Yakovlevich Suslin (November 15, 1894 – 21 October 1919, Krasavka) (sometimes transliterated Souslin) was a Russian mathematician who made major contributions to the fields of general topology and descriptive set theory.

Biography
Mikhail Suslin was born on November 15, 1894 in the village of Krasavka, the only child of poor peasants Yakov Gavrilovich and Matrena Vasil'evna Suslin. From a young age, Suslin showed a keen interest in mathematics and was encouraged to continue his education by his primary school teacher, Vera Andreevna Teplogorskaya-Smirnova. From 1905 to 1913 he attended Balashov boys' grammar school.

In 1913, Suslin enrolled at the Imperial Moscow University and studied under the tutelage of Nikolai Luzin. He graduated with a degree in mathematics in 1917 and immediately began working at the Ivanovo-Voznesensk Polytechnic Institute.

Suslin died of typhus in the 1919 Moscow epidemic following the Russian Civil War, at the age of 24.

Work
His name is especially associated to Suslin's problem, a question relating to totally ordered sets that was eventually found to be independent of the standard system of set-theoretic axioms, ZFC.

He contributed greatly to the theory of analytic sets, sometimes called after him, a kind of a set of reals that is definable via trees.

Publications

Suslin only published one paper during his life: a 4-page note.

See also

References

External links

1894 births
1919 deaths
20th-century Russian mathematicians
Set theorists
Deaths from typhus